The Kuwait Oil Company (KOC), an oil company headquartered in Al Ahmadi, Kuwait, is a subsidiary of the Kuwait Petroleum Corporation, a government-owned holding company. Kuwait was the world's 10th largest petroleum and other liquids producer in 2013, and fifth-largest exporter in terms of volume of crude oil and condensates. The managing director of the company is Ahmad Al-Eidan.

Kuwait Oil Company, or KOC, is one of the world’s leading National Oil Companies. Furthermore, the company is also considered the backbone of the economic and social development for the State of Kuwait. KOC ’operations and activities of exploring and producing oil make up nearly 90% of the national budget, which is still highly dependent on oil in its resources.

The Kuwait Oil Company Limited was established in 1934, through an alliance between the Anglo-Persian Oil Company, now known as the British Petroleum Company (BP), and the American Gulf Oil Company, now known as the Chevron Company, and is currently a subsidiary of the Kuwait Petroleum Corporation (KPC).

The oil concession rights were awarded to the Company on 23 December 1934, and it started its drilling operations in 1936. The first oil discovery was in 1938 in Burgan field, which is still considered the second largest oil field in the world. Discoveries then followed in Magwa in 1951, Ahmadi in 1952, Raudhatain in 1955, Sabriya in 1957, and Minagish in 1959.

On 30 June 1946, His Highness the late Sheikh Ahmad Al-Jaber Al-Sabah turned a silver wheel to start Kuwait's first crude oil export aboard the tanker "British Fusilier". This enabled the State of Kuwait to join the ranks of the world's major oil producers.

Since its establishment, the Company, whose responsibilities include exploration and production of oil and gas, and oil storage operations until it is delivered to tankers to complete the exportation process, has sought to continuously develop and enhance its operations, and has succeeded in achieving many world-class achievements. This was accomplished through launching and implementing numerous pioneering initiatives and projects, related to its basic work in oil and gas production, or in other matters specifically related to health, safety, security, and the environment, as well as the development of society, and supporting various State institutions and bodies in the public and private sectors.

Moreover, because one of its most important tasks is to maintain the position of the State of Kuwait as one of the most prominent oil-exporting countries in the world, KOC is keen to continue its operations under all circumstances, in order to fulfill the obligations of the State of Kuwait towards its partners. It is also always seeking to diversify its products in order to achieve more returns that pour into the State’s interest.

The Company used to produce one type of oil, Kuwaiti Export Crude, for many years. This, however, has changed recently. KOC had successfully, the past few years, provided two additional and distinguished types of oil, namely, high-quality Light Oil, and Heavy Oil, which are contributing in diversifying Kuwait's oil Portfolio, and gaining new customers in the global market, as the two new types have characteristics that are sought after in the international market.

In this regard, the Company focuses on enhancing the production of the three oils, until the Company's production capacity reached record levels exceeding three million barrels of oil per day, and continues to discover new reservoirs to support its reserves.

The Company is also working steadily to boost the pace of non-associated free gas production, which is close to reaching the production target set within the Sector’s 2040 Strategy, which is one billion cubic feet per day, by constructing a number of Jurassic gas production facilities and launching several other projects.

KOC has established many world-class facilities in various fields, most notably Ahmadi Hospital, which is considered a pioneering and state-of-the-art health edifice, serving all employees in the oil sector and their families. This consists of over 120,000 people, and it is equivalent in its health services, facilities, and initiatives to the best health institutions in the world.

Another one of the most prominent facilities is the Ahmed Al-Jaber Oil and Gas Exhibition, which is a distinguished facility and the first of its kind in Kuwait, where it offers a unique interactive and comprehensive learning experience. By touring its facilities and halls, the visitor learns everything they need to know about the oil and gas industry and its importance in our daily lives, as well as for the State of Kuwait.

KOC is committed in reducing the rates of natural gas flaring in its areas of operations. Recently, the company had reached less than 1% and is keen in maintaining this rate, bringing Kuwait to the forefront in this aspect among its peers of oil producing countries.

KOC is also a pioneer in adopting the latest technologies, and has been continuously developing its operations and launching pioneering initiatives to enhance its production. One of these initiatives is the Kuwait Integrated Digital Field project (KwIDF), which the Company uses for digital oilfield operations. KwIDF is one of the key strategic projects KOC relying on in support of oil and gas production in Kuwait.

All the aforementioned efforts and the developments resulting from them and others have made KOC one of the most prominent international companies in its field. It has also won many prestigious awards, honors, and recognition of its growing role in the global market. The Company is also a regular guest and an active participant in the most prominent regional and international high-level events and conferences.

Former chairmen

Ahmad Al-Eidan 2022-Present

Emad Sultan 2019–2022

Jamal Abdulaziz Ja'far 2016–2019

Hashim Sayed Hashim 2013–2016

Sami Al-Rushaid 2007–2013

Farouk Al-Zanki 2004–2007

Ahmad Al-Arbeed 2001–2004

Abdullatif Al-Tourah 1998–2001

Khalid Al-Fulaij 1992–1998

Abdulmalik Al-Gharabally 1984–1992

Ahmad Jaafar 1975-1983

James A. Strand 1972-1975

M. L. Ralston 1969-1972

James E. Lee 1966-1969

H.L. Scott 1965-1966

D.E.C. Steel 1962-1965

E. Boaden 1961-1962

L.T. Jordan 1948-1960

Hon. W. Fraser 1959-1962

Sir Philip Southwell 1946-1959

See also

Petroleum industry in Kuwait

References

External links
 

Oil and gas companies of Kuwait
Non-renewable resource companies established in 1934
1934 establishments in Kuwait